Niripola is a village in Western Province, Sri Lanka with an altitude of .

References

Populated places in Western Province, Sri Lanka